Zaiga is a Latvian feminine given name, which means "to glisten". The name may refer to:

Zaiga Jansone (born 1951), Latvian tennis player and coach

References 

Latvian feminine given names
Feminine given names